Ernest Louis de Gonzague Vandenpeereboom (12 July 1807, in Kortrijk – 11 November 1875, in Ypres) was a Belgian doctor in law, industrialist (textile) and liberal politician.

As a politician, he was a member of the municipal council of Kortrijk, member of the provincial council of West Flanders, a member of the Belgian parliament and comissinar of the arrondissement of Kortrijk. He was President of the Belgian Chamber of Representatives from 15 December 1863 until 23 October 1867.

See also
 Liberal Party
 Liberalism in Belgium

Sources
 Ernest Louis de Gonzague Vandenpeereboom
 De Paepe, Jean-Luc, Raindorf-Gérard, Christiane (ed.), Le Parlement Belge 1831-1894. Données Biographiques, Brussels, Académie Royale de Belgique, 1996, p. 561.

1807 births
1875 deaths
Presidents of the Chamber of Representatives (Belgium)